Franconia is an unincorporated community in Franconia Township, Chisago County, Minnesota, United States.

The community is located south of Taylors Falls near the junction of State Highway 95 (MN 95) and Franconia Trail.  The St. Croix River is nearby.

Lawrence Creek flows through the community.  Nearby places include Shafer, Taylors Falls, Lindstrom, and Scandia.

Franconia is home to the Franconia Sculpture Park at the intersection of Highways 8 and 95.

Osceola, Wisconsin is also nearby to the south-southeast.

History
Franconia was platted in 1858, and named after Franconia, New Hampshire, the native home of a first settler. A post office called Franconia was established in 1866, and remained in operation until it was discontinued in 1898.

References

Former municipalities in Minnesota
Unincorporated communities in Minnesota
Unincorporated communities in Chisago County, Minnesota